Khosrovidukht also known as Xosroviduxt (flourished second half of 3rd century & first half of 4th century) was a Princess of the Arsacid dynasty of Armenia, one of the client-kingdoms of the Roman Empire while being an eponymous branch of the Arsacid dynasty of Parthia. She is regarded as a prominent figure in Armenian society and is a significant figure in Christianity in Armenia.

Khosrovidukht was the known daughter of King Khosrov II of Armenia by an unnamed mother and her known sibling was her brother Tiridates III of Armenia who ruled Armenia from 287 to 330. The name Khosrovidukht was a dynastic name in the Arsacid royal house as she was the namesake of her father and her paternal great-grandfather Khosrov I, a previous ruling Armenian King.

Name
The name of "Khosrovidukht" (Xosrovi-dowxt) stems from the Parthian language, being a combination of the name "Khosrov" and the suffix of dukht (daughter), thus meaning "daughter of Khosrov."

Biography
She was born in an unknown city in Armenia. In 252, her father and the remainder of her family were assassinated by Anak a Parthian agent under the orders of King Ardashir I. After the capture and execution of Anak, in order to protect and preserve the Armenian sovereignty the Roman authorities took her brother as an infant to be raised and reared in Rome, while Khosrovidukht was taken to be raised in Caesarea Mazaca, Cappadocia. The foster parents of Khosrovidukht were Awtay a nobleman from the family of the Amatuni and Awtay's wife a noblewoman whose name is unknown was from the family of the Slkunik.

In the year 287, Tiridates III was restored to the Armenian throne by the Roman emperor Diocletian, which the country was previously ruled by the Parthian Kings and later by the Sassanids Kings who were expelled from Armenia by her brother and his army. After her brother became Armenian King, Khosrovidukht returned to the country with her foster family to be with her brother. At some date during his reign, Tiridates III erected at Garni for his sister, a summer residence ornamented with columns and magnificent bas-reliefs, the commemorative inscription was in Greek. The inscription reveals that the work was not done by Armenian hands.

Khosrovidukht, Tiridates III and many Armenians in that period were followers of the religion of Zoroastrianism. Zoroastrianism was the head religion of the Armenian state. In Tiridates III's reign, Christian persecutions occurred throughout the Roman Empire. As her brother was an ally to Rome, he participated in these events. Tiridates III ordered the execution of many Christians, who opposed to worship the various pagan religions in the Roman Empire. These Christians who Tiridates III had harshly persecuted lived in Armenia or had fled to the country to escape the religious massacres. Among his victims, Tiridates III was responsible for the martyrdom of the Hripsimeyan nuns and condemning Gregory the Illuminator to the Khor Virap a deep underground dungeon.

After the martyrdom of the Hripsimeyan nuns, Tiridates III had lost his sanity and had become mentally ill. Tiridates III adopted the behaviour of a wild boar, aimlessly wandering around in the forest. Out of concern for her brother, Khosrovidukht did everything within her possibilities to bring her brother back to sanity.

In her sleep, Khosrovidukht had a dream where a vision from God appeared to her. She saw in her dream a man in the likeness of light coming towards her and told her "there is no other cure for these torments that have come upon you, unless you send to the city of Artashat and bring thence the prisoner Gregory. When he comes he will teach you the remedy for your ills." Khosrovidukht had this vision five times. She came to speak to the people about her vision and the populace heard this and they began to mock her words. They began to say to her: "You too then are mad. Some demon has possessed you. How is it, because it is fifteen years since they threw him into the terribly pit, that you say he is alive? Where would even his bones be? For on the same day when they put him down there, he would have immediately dropped dead at the very sight of the snakes."

Following threats, that if unless she reported it immediately she would suffer great torments and the king would become even worse, Khosrovidukht came forward again in great fear and hesitation and told Tiridates III about her vision. Khosrovidukhts character was of a modest maiden like a nun and she did not have an open mouth like other women.

When Khosrovidukht told her brother about her visions, Tiridates III sent her foster father Awtay straight away to Artashat in order to release Gregory out of the dungeon and deep pit. When Gregory was brought to Tiridates III, he was imprisoned for 15 years, and since he was malnourished the odds of him being alive were slim. It is believed that Khosrovidukht or an other woman secretly fed Gregory during his captivity. While her brother ordered the persecutions of Christians, Khosrovidukht and her sister-in-law Ashkhen most probably had already accepted Christianity through the efforts of the Hripsimeyan nuns and others in the Armenian Christian underground. There is a possibility that Khosrovidukht and Ashkhen may have protected Christians from religious persecutions.

After Gregory was brought to Tiridates III, he was miraculously cured of his illness in 301. Tiridates III was persuaded by the power of the cure  immediately proclaimed Christianity as the official religion of the state in Armenia. Thus Armenia became the first nation to officially adopt Christianity and Gregory was appointed Catholicos of the Armenian Apostolic Church. As Tiridates III recovered from his illness he became a passionate Christian and the Christian persecutions had ended. Sometime after Tiridates III's baptism, Gregory baptised Tiridates III's family, his entire court and his army on the Euphrates river.

From 301 onwards until her death, possibly around 330, Khosrovidukht and her family dedicated the rest of their lives to the service of Jesus Christ. As Tiridates III encouraged and supported the spread of Christianity, Tiridates III, Khosrovidukht and Ashkhen participated in the construction of the Etchmiadzin Cathedral, Saint Gayane Church, Saint Hripsime Church and the Shoghakat Church. During the construction of Saint Gayane and Saint Hripsime Churches, Ashkhen and Khosrovidukht donated their jewels for the expenses for the church.

Towards the end of her life, Khosrovidukht and Ashkhen retired to the castle of Garni. Khosrovidukht, Tiridates III and Ashkhen are Saints in the Armenian Apostolic Church and their feast day is on Saturday after the fifth Sunday after Pentecost. On this feast day To the Kings is sung. Their feast day is usually around June 30.

Gallery

See also
Armenian Apostolic Church
Arsacid dynasty of Armenia

References

Sources
 Armenian Names – Female:Khosrovidkht
 Moslem architecture: its origins and development, by G.T. Riviora, translated from the Italian by G.M.C.N. Rushforth Humphrey Milford, Oxford University Press, 1918
 R.W. Thomson, Agathangelos's History of the Armenians, SUNY Press, 1976
 B. Eghiayean, Heroes of Hayastan: a dramatic novel history of Armenia, Armenian National Fund, 1993
 M.H. Dodgeon & S.N.C Lieu, The Roman Eastern Frontier and the Persian Wars AD 226–363, A documentary History Compiled and edited, Routledge, 1994

Further reading
 Fowden, Garth. The Journal of Roman Studies, Vol. 84. (1994), pp. 146–170. 
 Thomson, Robert W. Dumbarton Oaks Papers, Vol. 43. (1989), pp. 125–226.

External links
 A rural of Khosrovidukht with her brother Tiridates III, being near a lake witnessing the baptism of her brother by Saint Gregory the Illuminator. The rural is on the doors of Saint Vartan's Cathedral in New York City

Armenian saints
Arsacid dynasty of Armenia
Armenian Apostolic Christians
Oriental Orthodox monarchs
3rd-century Armenian people
4th-century Armenian people
4th-century Christian saints
3rd-century women
4th-century women
Armenian princesses